Colaspidea oblonga is a species of beetle in the family Chrysomelidae that can be found on Balearic Islands and Crete. It can also be found in such European countries as France, Germany, and the Italian islands of Corsica, Sardinia, and Sicily (including the mainland). Besides the central European countries, it can also be found in all states of former Yugoslavia, except for North Macedonia, and in Tunisia.

References

Eumolpinae
Beetles described in 1855
Beetles of Europe
Taxa named by Émile Blanchard

nl:Colaspidea metallica
vi:Colaspidea metallica